Robert Napier may refer to:

People
 Robert Napier (engineer) (1791–1876), Scottish marine engineer
 Robert Napier and Sons, Scottish marine engineers and shipbuilders
 Sir Robert Napier (judge) (died 1615), English judge, Member of Parliament, Chief Baron of the Exchequer in Ireland
 Sir Robert Napier, 1st Baronet, of Luton Hoo (1560–1637), English merchant
 Sir Robert Napier, 2nd Baronet (c. 1603–1661), his son, Member of Parliament
 Robert Napier (British Army officer, died 1766), British Adjutant-General to the Forces
 Robert Napier, 1st Baron Napier of Magdala (1810–1890), British field marshal
 Sir Robert Napier, 1st Baronet, of Punknoll (1642–1700), English lawyer and politician
 Robert D. Napier (1821–1885), Scottish engineer
 Sir Robert Surtees Napier (1932–1994), British baronet and soldier

Other uses
 Robert Napier School, Gillingham, Kent

See also
John Napier (footballer) (born 1946), birth name Robert John Napier